Francesco De Grado (Naples, active 1694–1730) was an Italian engraver.

Biography
He engraved a work by Raffaele Maria Filamondo, titled , published in Naples in 1694 with designs by Filippo Schor, son of the famous engraver Johann Paul Schor. Also De Grado illustrated  with designs by Michelangelo De Balsio. This text was edited by Francesco Riccardi in 1734 with designs by Cristoforo Rossi and Domenico Antonio Vaccaro. His two sons Angelo and Bartolomeo, as well as Bartolomeo's son Filippo, were also engravers.

Cirillo made designs engraved by De Grado for the Archeologist Alessio Simmaco Mazzocchi's text: In mutilum Campani ampitheatri titulum aliasque nonnullas Campanas inscriptiones Commetarius, published in Naples in 1727, and including a depiction of a Roman amphitheater in Capua.

Angelo and Bartolomeo and the latter's son Filippo were also engravers.

References

17th-century Italian artists
18th-century Italian artists
Italian engravers
People from Naples